The Committee on Aeronautical and Space Sciences was a standing committee of the United States Senate from 1958 until 1977, when it was folded into the U.S. Senate Committee on Commerce, Science and Transportation. It was preceded by the Special Committee on Space and Astronautics, which operated from February 6, 1958, to March 11, 1959.

History
The Committee on Aeronautical and Space Sciences was established July 24, 1958, when the Senate adopted S. Res. 327, introduced by Senator Lyndon Johnson. The resolution also extended the term of the Special Committee on Space and Astronautics until March 11, 1959, so it could complete its final report. Many of the members of the special committee joined the new standing committee.

Jurisdiction
The standing committee was given jurisdiction over the National Aeronautics and Space Administration and all aeronautical and space sciences generally. However, matters concerning the development of weapons systems or military operations were reserved for the Senate Armed Services Committee. However, the Space Committee was permitted to survey, review, and report on both military and civilian space activities of the United States. According to Senate Rule 25, as amended at the time, the committee was to consist of 16 Senators.

Chairmen

Special Committee on Space and Astronautics
Lyndon B. Johnson (D-TX) February 6, 1958March 11, 1959

Committee on Aeronautical and Space Sciences
Lyndon B. Johnson (D-TX) 1958-1961
Robert S. Kerr (D-OK) 1961-1963
Clinton P. Anderson (D-NM) 1963-1973
Frank E. Moss (D-UT) 1973-1977
Wendell H. Ford (D-KY) January 10February 11, 1977

References

Aeronautical and Space Sciences
1958 establishments in Washington, D.C.
1977 disestablishments in Washington, D.C.
NASA oversight